Vera Mantero (born 1966) is a Portuguese dancer and choreographer. After performing for five years with the Gulbenkian Ballet, she turned to choreography in 1987 and has since performed widely in Europe and North and South America. A major figure in new Portuguese dance, she frequently improvises with Mark Tompkins, Meg Stuart and Steve Paxton.

References

1966 births
Living people
People from Lisbon
Portuguese ballet dancers
Portuguese female dancers
Portuguese choreographers